Muntinlupa National High School or simply MNHS is one of the public schools in Muntinlupa, Philippines. Located in NBP Reservation, Brgy. Poblacion, Muntinlupa. The school, established in 1945, is now headed by Dr. Antonio B. Rocha.

System
The Muntinlupa National High School curriculum for Junior High School:
STE (formerly ESEP) caters students with future professions in Science, Technology and Engineering. Students in this curriculum underwent a series of screening activities including an exam and interview. 
Regular curriculum follows the basic system of Philippine education

Muntinlupa National High School Tracks for Senior High School:

Academic Track
Accountancy, Business and Management Strand is for students with ambitions in the field of business and finance.
General Academic Strand which is for those who will pursue basic professions including education and criminology, and for undecided students
Science, Technology, Engineering and Mathematics Strand is for the students who aspire to be involved in the fields of Science and Math.

Arts and Design and Sports Track

Technological Vocational Livelihood Track
Home Economics
Information and Communications Technology

The senior high school is currently headed by Dr. Mylyn M. Vallejo.

International Awards
 Global High School (GHS) category for the East & Asia Pacific of the 2019 Zayed Sustainability Prize (ZSP).

See also
List of schools in Muntinlupa

References

High schools in Metro Manila
Educational institutions established in 1945
1945 establishments in the Philippines
Schools in Muntinlupa